Paratapes undulatus, common name undulate venus, is a species of saltwater clam, a marine bivalve mollusk in the family Veneridae, the Venus clams.

Distribution and habitat
This species inhabits the inshore shallow sandy seabed in the Indo-West Pacific (Red Sea to Papua New Guinea; north to Japan and south to New South Wales).

Description

Human culture
These clams are a popular food in most Asian countries including China, the Philippines, Thailand and Vietnam.

Gallery

References

 Huber M. (2015). Compendium of bivalves 2. Harxheim: ConchBooks. 907 pp

Veneridae
Bivalves described in 1778